is a professional Japanese baseball player. He plays pitcher for the Tokyo Yakult Swallows.

He was the first pick for the Swallows at the 2015 NPB Draft.

On February 27, 2019, he was selected for Japan national baseball team at the 2019 exhibition games against Mexico.

References

External links

 NPB.com

1993 births
Living people
People from Kakogawa, Hyōgo
Toyo University alumni
Japanese baseball players
Nippon Professional Baseball pitchers
Tokyo Yakult Swallows players
Baseball people from Hyōgo Prefecture